Graham Cyril Russell (born 11 June 1950) is an English musician, singer-songwriter, producer and guitarist of the soft rock duo Air Supply.

In 1975, with Russell Hitchcock, he formed Air Supply in Australia.  The duo have been singing and performing romantic songs and ballads, such as "Lost in Love", "All Out of Love", "Every Woman in the World", "The One That You Love", "Even the Nights Are Better", "Goodbye" and "Making Love Out of Nothing at All", for more than 45 years.

Early life 
Russell was born in Arnold, Nottingham. He had a strong interest in poetry, music and books since his childhood. At the age of 11, he started writing poems and in the same year of 1961, he composed his first song, called "That Rockin' Feeling".

Self-taught, he learned to play guitar and percussion alone and, after the loss of his mother in childhood, he became a loner and thereby found in music and poems a way to express his loss and his emotions.

He attended the Carlton-Le-Willows, a technical school in Gedling, Nottingham, where his love for literature and the great English poets only grew further, fueled by study and also an interest that developed on the arts of the paranormal and occult sciences, highlighted by the works of writers Shelley, Keats, and Lord Byron.

In 1963, the music of the Beatles was a strong influence that marked his life that year, and after watching a live show in 1964, Russell decided that he wanted to be a musician. Russell joined a band called Union Blues in 1965, where he played percussion, but really wanted to play his own songs in front of the stage.

Career 
In 1968, he moved to Australia and formed a second band in Melbourne, and began to also play solo in cafes and dance clubs, gaining ground on the Australian circuit.

In 1973, after reading spiritual and mystical content in search of knowledge and answers for several questions about life, Russell joined the rock opera Jesus Christ Superstar in 1975 and met Russell Hitchcock on the first day and became instant friends. They would sing Beatles songs together during and after shows and this would eventually lead them to form the band Air Supply.

After 18 months in Jesus Christ Superstar, Graham Russell and Russell Hitchcock formed the band under the name which Graham Russell had seen in a dream, a giant bright lights plate in which could be read "Air Supply". Their first single, "Love and Other Bruises", became a success.
In 1976, after opening for Rod Stewart in Australia and also in the United States in 1977, Air Supply went on tour and two more hit records ensued, "Lost in Love" and "All Out of Love".

In 1979, Clive Davis heard the song "Lost in Love", and the band signed to the label Arista Records. The first single on the Hot 100, "Lost in Love", reached the top 3 in May 1980, and Graham Russell's "The One That You Love" reached the top in July 1981.

Personal life 
In 1967, Russell married a high school sweetheart, Linda, and had a son with her the following year, Simon, who is currently working with his father, organising concerts and the fan club. Graham and Linda also had a daughter, Samantha, born in March 1972. Graham Russell's marriage to Linda ended in 1978.

In 1981, Russell met Jodi Varble at a show and, after two years in which they exchanged correspondence only, became a couple and married in 1986, when Jodi was 21 and Russell was 36.

In 1983, he and Hitchcock moved to the US as members of Air Supply. He currently lives in Park City, Utah.

Discography 

Solo
The Future (2007)

Of Eden
Feel (2013)
Astral Love (2020)

G and the Jolly Cucumbers
The Perfect Lover (2022)

References 

  Note: Archived [on-line] copy has limited functionality.
  Note: [on-line] version established at White Room Electronic Publishing Pty Ltd in 2007 and was expanded from the 2002 edition.

1950 births
APRA Award winners
People educated at Carlton le Willows Academy
Living people
20th-century English singers
21st-century English singers
English male singers
English rock singers
English pop singers
Rhythm guitarists
English male guitarists
English rock guitarists
English male singer-songwriters
English record producers
English songwriters
British soft rock musicians
People from Nottingham
Ballad musicians
Musicians from Nottinghamshire
Air Supply members
Arista Records artists
Giant Records (Warner) artists
Sony BMG artists
People from Arnold, Nottinghamshire